Claude Mantoulan, nicknamed La Mantoule, (Pau, 5 March 1936 – Perpignan, 9 September 1983) is a French former rugby union and rugby league player.

Biography 
A fly-half, centre or fullback, he had excellent technical and offensive qualifies but his defense was average.

Opting for rugby league, he is, after Gilbert Benausse, the second most capped player of the France national rugby league team.

Rugby union career

Club 
 Section Paloise
 Runner-up at the Challenge Yves du Manoir (1959)

France national team 
 International (1 capt) against Ireland (18) before the 1959 Five Nations Championship won by France.

Rugby league career

Club 
 Roanne XIII
 XIII Catalan

Palmarès 
 French Champion with Roanne XIII (1960), and XIII Catalan (1969)
 Winner of the Lord Derby Cup with Roanne XIII (1962), and XIII Catalan (1969)
 Runner-up of the French Championship with Roanne XIII (1961), and XIII Catalan (1970)
 Runner-up of the Lord Derby Cup with XIII Catalan (1967)

France national team 

 International (46 caps) between 1959 and 1970 (his debut was against Australia (1959)).
 Took part at the 1960 Rugby League World Cup

References

External links 
 Claude Mantoulan international rugby union statistics at ESPN Scrum
 Claude Mantoulan at rugbyleagueproject.com

1936 births
1983 deaths
Dual-code rugby internationals
France international rugby union players
France national rugby league team players
French rugby union coaches
RC Roanne XIII players
Rugby union centres
Rugby union fly-halves
Rugby union fullbacks
Section Paloise players
Sportspeople from Pau, Pyrénées-Atlantiques
XIII Catalan players
French rugby union players
French rugby league players
Rugby league five-eighths